The Final Winter is an Australian drama film released in 2007. It was directed by Brian Andrews and Jane Forrest and produced by Anthony Coffee, and Michelle Russell, while independently produced it is being distributed by Paramount Pictures. It was written by Matthew Nable who also starred as the lead role 'Grub' Henderson. The film, which earned praise from critics, focuses around Grub, who is the captain of the Newtown Jets rugby league team in the early 1980s, and his determination to stand for what rugby league traditionally stood for while dealing with his own identity crisis.
The Final Winter was adapted to the stage in 2015 by Justin Brice Performed in Albury–Wodonga for four nights starting on 15 July to sold-out crowds.  Justin Brice is an Albury–Wodonga local performer and stage writer who dedicated three years to crafting the script to fit on a theatre stage.

Plot
The film explores the way in which business tore up the loyalty that was between Grub's club and family. Essentially this is a metaphor for the way in which business began to imprint the game of Rugby League during the 1980s, and saw the rise of commercialism in the game. Consequently, Grub must battle with an administration that wanted him gone and additionally his brother and coach's betrayal. The film also deals with the domestic issues between Grub and his wife and his children, as their husband and father has been transformed from who he was to who he has become.

Cast
Matt Nable as Mick "Grub" Henderson
Bob Baines as Neddy
Conrad Coleby as Billy
Nathaniel Dean as Trent Henderson
Damian De Montemas as Max
Kevin Golsby as Judiciary Chairman
Raelee Hill as Emma Henderson
John Jarratt as Colgate
Matthew Johns as Jack Cooper
Michelle Langstone as Mia
Scott Lowe as Muddy
Katie Nazer-Hennings as Rebecca Henderson
Tiarnie Coupland as Jessica Henderson

The film also features cameo appearances from Tom Raudonikis, Roy Masters, Thomas Keneally, Jack Elsegood, Max Krilich, Terry Randall, Phil Sigsworth, Noel "Ned" Kelly Ivan Cleary, Les Johns, Craig Hancock, Terry Serio, Peter Peters, and Australian Wrestling Federation ring announcer 'The Duke of Wrestling' Kieran Burns.

References

External links
 The Final Winter at IMDb
 Greater Union Blurb

2007 films
Australian independent films
2000s sports drama films
Australian sports drama films
Films set in Australia
Films set in the 1980s
Rugby league films
Newtown Jets
2007 independent films
2007 drama films
2000s English-language films